Atractaspis corpulenta, or the fat burrowing asp, is a species of snake in the Atractaspididae family. It is endemic to Africa.

Description
Blackish brown above and below; tail sometimes white. Snout strongly projecting, cuneiform. Rostral large, upper portion as long as its distance from the frontal. Dorsal scales in 23, 25, or 27 rows. Ventrals 178–193; anal entire; subcaudals 23–27, all entire or only a few divided. Total length ; tail .

References

External Links
iNaturalist page

Atractaspididae
Reptiles described in 1854